Parempoolsed is a self-declared fiscally conservative political party in Estonia. The party has no representation in parliament.

History 
The party was formed in August 2022, mostly by a split-off group of former members of the Isamaa party.

The party gained its first and only member in the Riigikogu Siim Valmar Kiisler when he joined in September 2022.

Ideology 
Parempoolsed are a right-of-centre party. Their leaders have repeatedly declared support for Estonia's continued membership of the European Union and its common market. They also claim to oppose "bureaucracy", "populism", and what they view as a recent "left turn" in Estonian politics. They have called for more privatisation and competition in health care, as well as fiscal responsibility and lowering taxation in general. They support immigration, stating "conservative policy does not consist in denying immigration" while saying it should be managed "based on the interests of Estonia's economy and security." They also intend on limiting "the state's collection of data concerning people's private lives".

Election results

Parliamentary elections

References 

Conservative parties in Estonia
Political parties in Estonia
Political parties established in 2022
2022 establishments in Estonia